John Dunn (1820 – 10 September 1860) was a British Conservative politician.

After unsuccessfully contesting Totnes at the 1859 general election, Dunn was elected Conservative MP for Dartmouth at a by-election in 1859—caused by the previous election of Edward Wyndham Harrington Schenley being declared void due to bribery and corruption. He held the seat until his death in 1860.

References

UK MPs 1859–1865
1820 births
1860 deaths
Conservative Party (UK) MPs for English constituencies
Members of the Parliament of the United Kingdom for Dartmouth